Drunken noodles or drunkard noodles is a Thai stir-fried noodle dish similar to phat si-io but spicier.

The dish is widely available in restaurants or at street vendors in Thailand but it is also highly popular in the United States, and has become ubiquitous on Thai restaurant menus throughout. Despite its name, alcohol is not one of the ingredients.

Ingredients 
The dish originates from a spicy stir-fry dish that originally did not include noodles. The base ingredients of the aforementioned spicy stir-fry are: garlic, shallots, fresh chilies, and shrimp paste, and holy basil (for topping). Eventually, the stir-fry was converted into a noodle dish made with broad rice noodles (kuaitiao sen yai in Thai), soy sauce, fish sauce, oyster sauce, garlic, meat, seafood, chili, fresh black pepper pods and holy basil, which give rise to its distinctive spiciness. Certain versions of this dish may include eggs. The recipe for the noodles is not rigid and may often differ.

Substitutions for some base ingredients can be made and the dish can be easily made vegetarian or vegan. Fish sauce can be substituted for Thai thin soy sauce. The meat or seafood can be substituted for tofu or vegetables such as cabbage, carrots, broccoli, snow peas, or bell peppers. Broad rice noodles may be substituted for fresh chewy rice noodles or even regular pad Thai noodles. Some may even leave out noodles and instead serve the vegetables and protein stir-fry with rice. Other variations include the dish using instant noodles, or a fusion version using spaghetti instead of rice noodles.

Pad see ew is generally regarded to be a sister recipe to this dish. Drunken fried rice or khao phat khi mao are similarly prepared dishes using the same base ingredients.

History 
The origin of the name behind the dish is unclear, but there are several explanations. One anecdotal explanation for the name "drunkard (or drunken) noodles" is that the meal is often consumed after a night of drinking, prepared from assorted leftovers commonly on hand and staple ingredients. Others say that the name comes through the idea that the spicy seasoning of the dish is "meant to tear through the dulled palates of the inebriated." Another anecdotal explanation is that during the Vietnam War, the US troops couldn't pronounce the colloquially pronounced name for mixed noodles dish that sounded to them like “drunken”, and that's how the name became popular.

There are also local stories regarding the origins of the dish. One story is that a wife was upset by her husband's post-drinking behavior and decided to teach him a lesson. She added as many spices as she could find to his favorite noodles. She believed that the heavy mixture of spices along with a handful of chilies would fix her husband's behavior.

Gallery

See also
Drunken chicken
Fried noodles

References

Laotian noodle dishes
Thai noodle dishes
Fried noodles